Dergah (also known as Darkeh and Derkah) is a village in Dowlatabad Rural District, in the Central District of Ravansar County, Kermanshah Province, Iran. At the 2006 census, its population was 67, in 13 families.

References 

Populated places in Ravansar County